Treavor Alvarado  (born June 27, 1990), better known by his stage name DJ Trevi, and under other pseudonyms such as Martin Treavor, is an American electronic music, DJ, music producer, composer, reality show personality, and actor. He appeared in the independent film Left at the Rio Grande and 12 Corazones, the second season of Telemundo's long-running reality television series.

His first single, "Love", scored him his first top ten. It peaked at number 9 on MTV Jango Radio Airplay. In 2012 his debut album EP, Apocalypse 2012, was released on CS Recordings.

Early life 
Alvarado grew up in the United States, Germany, and Spain. In his early years, he played DJ with his weekly top show. His mother bought him his first mixer and turntables in his tween years.

Career

Television and film 
Before becoming an international DJ and producer, Alvarado was an intern at American Broadcasting Company, working on the Emmy-winning magazine show Vista LA.

His TV appearances include 12 Corazones.

In 2005 Karla Shelton cast Alvarado in the independent film Left at the Rio Grande,  directed by Kevin Abrams (film director).

In 2007 Alvarado worked on the TLC reality series Kids By The Dozen.

CS Recordings label and Apocalypse 2012

On October 10, 2011, his first hit single, "Love", went on rotation with artists like Deadmau5, Tiesto, Daft Punk, and Swedish House Mafia, peaking at number 9 on MTV-owned Jango Radio Air Play.

In 2012, Alvarado began his own record label, CS Recordings, which, along with LW Recordings, released the 2012 album, Apocalypse 2012. It featured the songs "Apocalypse 2012", "Get Down", "Superhero", and the hard dance track Schizophrenia".

"Love" and "Apocalypse 2012" were featured in the documentary Gay Latino Los Angeles: Coming Of Age.Music: SoundTrack Listing to Gay Latino. LA "Schizophrenia" was featured on the mega-series Amsterdam Dance Essentials: Hard Dance, and became one of the most downloaded songs on iTunes. 
On August 14, 2012, "No Way Out" was released, and was nominated for Best Dance/Electronic single of the year at the 23rd Annual L.A. Music Awards. In 2013 Alvarado teamed up with Mike Avery and Tiffany Jackson and released the single "Movin'", his first single to reach the top 20 on Track It Down's Hard Dance Charts. The follow-up, a Billy Seal remix of "Apocalypse", also reached the top 10 on Track It Down's Electro House Charts.

Spanish TV, film and Dancing Nowhere

In 2021 Alvarado played a DJ in the film Party Beast. He made his Spanish prime-time TV debut on the third season of Cuatro's reality series First Dates.

With high ratings and a trending base on social media, Alvarado made headlines.

He announced that he would release new techno music under the name Martin Treavor.

Alvarado produced the track "Tu Ca Nun Chiagne" for Tunisian singer Haythme Hadhiri, which received attention on Tunisian and Moroccan TV and radio.

Personal life
Alvarado grew up in the United States but moved to Barcelona, Spain in 2016 to continue his music and film career. Alvarado was also a member of the United States Army reaching a rank of staff sergeant (SSG). A E-6 rank in the U.S. Army, just above sergeant and below sergeant first class

TelevisionJugar a Ganar, Telemundo, 2005 - Cake Boy12 Corazones, Telemundo, 2005 - CancerKids By The Dozen, TLC, 2007 - Treavor
 First Dates, Cuatro, 2018 - Himself

FilmLeft at the Rio Grande, AFI; 2005 - MannyCobarde, Young Talents Film, 2017 - CinematographerChantaje, Young Talents Film, 2017 - CinematographerParty Beasts'', Maat mons Films, 2021 - DJ (short film)

Discography
 "Love" (single) (CS Recordings; 2011) 
 "Apocalypse 2012" (EP) (CS Recordings; 2012)
 "No Way Out" (single) (CS Recordings; 2013)
 "Movin" with Mike Avery (single) (CS Recordings; 2013)
 "Apocalypse (The Second Coming)" (single) (CS Recordings; 2013)
 "Shallow" with Mike Avery (single) (CS Recordings; 2014)
 "Tu Ca Nun Chiagne" by Haythme Hadhiri, produced by DJ Trevi (single) (CS Recordings; 2017)
 "7 (God's Child)" (single) (CS Recordings; 2018)
 "Oh Father" (single) (CS Recordings; 2019)
 "Out Of Me" (single) by Dimitris Nezis Produced and written by Treavor Alvarado and Dimitris Nezis (2020)
 "Get Down" (single) (CS Recordings; 2021)

Awards

L.A. Music Awards
In November 2013, DJ Trevi was nominated for best dance single of the year.

|-
| rowspan=7| 2013
| rowspan=4| "No Way Out"
| Best Dance/Electronic Single of Year
|

Military awards and aecorations
Alvarado is the recipient of the following awards:

References

External links

Profile at CS Recordings

Living people
Musicians from Los Angeles
Participants in American reality television series
Tracker musicians
Electro house musicians
21st-century American male actors
American DJs
1990 births
North American people of French descent
Electronic dance music DJs
Record producers from California
American musicians of Basque descent
American people of Basque descent
United States Army soldiers
Spanish television actors
 Male actors from Barcelona
Mexican people of French descent
Mexican people of Basque descent
Musicians from Barcelona